The  is a national expressway in Japan. It is owned and operated by East Nippon Expressway Company.

Naming

The course of the expressway takes it alongside the coastline of the Sea of Japan (Nihonkai) in the Tōhoku region of Japan.

The Nihonkai-Tōhoku Expressway is the operating name for the sections of the Nihonkai Engan Tōhoku Expressway that are operated by East Nippon Expressway Company. The Nihonkai Engan Tōhoku Expressway is an official designation consisting of several routes that link Niigata with Aomori via Yamagata and Akita, reaching a total of approximately 322 km.

Overview

The first section of the expressway was opened to traffic in 2001. As of March 2008 the expressway incomplete in many areas. The next section is scheduled to open in 2009 (Nakajō Interchange to Arakawa Interchange) to coincide with the National Sports Festival which is planned to be held in Niigata that year. After this, all future sections will be built according to the New Direct Control System, whereby the burden for construction costs will be shared by the national and local governments and no tolls will be collected. Currently the section between Honjō Interchange and Iwaki Interchange operates according to this principle.

The expressway is 4 lanes from Niigata-Chūō Junction to Toyosaka Service Area, and 2 lanes for all remaining sections.

The route parallels the Uetsu Main Line of East Japan Railway Company and National Route 7 for much of its length.

List of interchanges and features

 IC - interchange, SIC - smart interchange, JCT - junction, SA - service area, PA - parking area, BS - bus stop, TB - toll gate, BR - bridge, TN - tunnel

Niigata section

{| class="wikitable"
|-
!style="border-bottom:3px solid green;"|No.
!style="border-bottom:3px solid green;"|Name
!style="border-bottom:3px solid green;"|Connections
!style="border-bottom:3px solid green;"|Dist. fromOrigin
!style="border-bottom:3px solid green;"|Dist. fromTerminus
!style="border-bottom:3px solid green;"|Bus Stop
!style="border-bottom:3px solid green;"|Notes
!colspan="2" style="border-bottom:3px solid green;"|Location(all in Niigata)
|-
|colspan="8" style="text-align: center;"|'''Through to  Hokuriku Expressway
|-
!style="background-color: #BFB;"|(42)
|Niigata-Chūō JCT
| Ban-etsu Expressway
|style="text-align: center;"|0.0
|style="text-align: center;"|67.5
|style="text-align: center;"|
|
|rowspan="4" style="text-align: center;"|Kōnan-ku, Niigata
|-
!style="background-color: #BFB;"|1[43]
|Niigata-Kameda IC
| National Route 49
|style="text-align: center;"|3.2
|style="text-align: center;"|64.3
|style="text-align: center;"|
|
|-
!style="background-color: #BFB;"|1-1/BS
|Niigata-Higashi SIC/Nishino Bus Stop
|Pref. Route 4 (Niigata Port Yokogo Route)
|style="text-align: center;"|7.4
|style="text-align: center;"|60.1
|style="text-align: center;"|○
|
|-
!style="background-color: #BFB;"|2[44]
|Niigata Airport IC
|Pref. Route 16 (Niigata Kameda Uchino Route)
|style="text-align: center;"|9.2
|style="text-align: center;"|58.3
|style="text-align: center;"|
|
|-
!style="background-color: #BFB;"|2-1/SA
|Toyosaka SA/SIC
|Pref. Route 27 (Niigata Yasuda Route)
|style="text-align: center;"|11.7
|style="text-align: center;"|55.8
|style="text-align: center;"|
|SIC: Nakajō-bound exit, Niigata-bound entrance only
|rowspan="3" style="text-align: center;"|Kita-ku, Niigata
|-
!style="background-color: #BFB;"|BS
|Kuzutsuka Bus Stop
|
|style="text-align: center;"|16.6
|style="text-align: center;"|50.9
|style="text-align: center;"|○
|
|-
!style="background-color: #BFB;"|3
|Toyosaka-Niigatahigashikō IC
|Pref. Route 46 (Niigata Chūō Kanjō Route)
|style="text-align: center;"|18.3
|style="text-align: center;"|49.2
|style="text-align: center;"|
|
|-
!style="background-color: #BFB;"|4
|Seirō-Shibata IC
| National Route 7 (Niigata Bypass)
|style="text-align: center;"|25.7
|style="text-align: center;"|41.8
|style="text-align: center;"|○
|
|rowspan="1" style="text-align: center;"|Seirō
|-
!style="background-color: #BFB;"|BS
|Kajikawa-Shiunji Bus Stop
|
|style="text-align: center;"|31.6
|style="text-align: center;"|35.9
|style="text-align: center;"|○
|
|rowspan="2" style="text-align: center;"|Shibata
|-
!style="background-color: #BFB;"|
|Emergency Exit
|
|style="text-align: center;"|↓
|style="text-align: center;"|↑
|style="text-align: center;"|
|style="background-color: #d3d3d3"|Access for Shibata HospitalAuthorized vehicles only
|-
!style="background-color: #BFB;"|5
|Nakajō IC
|Pref. Route 591 (Nakajō Inter Route)
|style="text-align: center;"|36.9
|style="text-align: center;"|30.6
|style="text-align: center;"|
|
|rowspan="3" style="text-align: center;"|Tainai
|-
!style="background-color: #BFB;"|TB
|Nakajō Toll Gate
|
|style="text-align: center;"|37.0
|style="text-align: center;"|30.5
|style="text-align: center;"|
|
|-
!style="background-color: #BFB;"|BS
|Tainai Bus Stop
|
|style="text-align: center;"|41.4
|style="text-align: center;"|26.1
|style="text-align: center;"|○
|
|-
!style="background-color: #BFB;"|6
|Arakawa-Tainai IC
| National Route 113
|style="text-align: center;"|46.6
|style="text-align: center;"|20.9
|style="text-align: center;"|
|
|rowspan="7" style="text-align: center;"|Murakami
|-
!style="background-color: #BFB;"|PA/BS
|Arakawa PA/BS
|
|style="text-align: center;"|49.1
|style="text-align: center;"|18.4
|style="text-align: center;"|X
|Bus Stop closed
|-
!style="background-color: #BFB;"|7
|Kamihayashi-Iwafunekō IC
|
|style="text-align: center;"|53.7
|style="text-align: center;"|13.8
|style="text-align: center;"|
|
|-
!style="background-color: #BFB;"|8
|Murakami-Senamionsen IC
|Pref. Route 286 (Iwafune Port Route)Pref. Route 531 (Murakami Kamihayashi Route)
|style="text-align: center;"|57.7
|style="text-align: center;"|9.8
|style="text-align: center;"|
|
|-
!style="background-color: #BFB;"|9
||Murakami-Saberi IC
||Pref. Route 207 (Ōkurida Murakami Route)
|style="text-align: center;"|61.4
|style="text-align: center;"|6.1
|style="text-align: center;"|
|style="background-color: #ffdddd"|Asahi-bound exit, Murakami-bound entrance only
|-
!style="background-color: #BFB;"|10
||Asahi-Miomote IC
||Pref. Route 349 (Tsuruoka Murakami Route)
|style="text-align: center;"|63.7
|style="text-align: center;"|4.2
|style="text-align: center;"|
|style="background-color: #ffdddd"|Asahi-bound exit, Murakami-bound entrance only
|-
!style="background-color: #BFB;"|11
||Asahi-Mahoroba IC
||Pref. Route 208 (Koage Sarusawa Route)
|style="text-align: center;"|67.5
|style="text-align: center;"|0
|style="text-align: center;"|
||
|-

Yamagata section

{| class="wikitable"
|-
!style="border-bottom:3px solid green;"|No.
!style="border-bottom:3px solid green;"|Name
!style="border-bottom:3px solid green;"|Connections
!style="border-bottom:3px solid green;"|Dist. fromOrigin
!style="border-bottom:3px solid green;"|Dist. fromTerminus
!style="border-bottom:3px solid green;"|Bus Stop
!style="border-bottom:3px solid green;"|Notes
!style="border-bottom:3px solid green;"|Location(all in Yamagata)
|-
!style="background-color: #BFB;"|13
|Atsumi-Onsen IC
|Pref. Route 348 (Atsumigawa Kinomata Oiwagawa Route)
|style="text-align: center;"|104.2
|
|
|
|rowspan="6" style="text-align: center;"|Tsuruoka
|-
!style="background-color: #BFB;"|14
|Iragawa IC
|Pref. Route 61 (Sugenodai Katanorizawa Route)
|style="text-align: center;"|112.1
|
|
|style="background:#ffdddd;"|Atsumi-bound exit, Tsuruoka-bound entrance only
|-
!style="background-color: #BFB;"|15
|Sanze IC
|
|style="text-align: center;"|116.9
|
|
|style="background:#ffdddd;"|Atsumi-bound exit, Tsuruoka-bound entrance only
|-
!style="background-color: #BFB;"|PA
|Yabiki PA
|
|style="text-align: center;"|121.5121.6
|
|
|style="background:#ffdddd;"|Tsuruoka-boundAtsumi-boundOrdinary cars only  
|-
!style="background-color: #BFB;"|16
|Tsuruoka-nishi IC
| National Route 7
|style="text-align: center;"|125.4
|
|
|
|-
!style="background-color: #BFB;"|17
|Tsuruoka JCT
| Yamagata Expressway
|style="text-align: center;"|130.1
|
|
|Atsumi ←→ Yamagata Expwy: No access
|-
!style="background-color: #BFB;"|18
|Shōnai Airport IC
| Pref. Route 33 (Shōnai Airport Tachikawa Route) – Shonai Airport
|style="text-align: center;"|138.8
|style="text-align: center;"|
|style="text-align: center;"|
|
|rowspan="4" style="text-align: center;"|Sakata
|-
!style="background-color: #BFB;"|19
|Sakata IC/Toll Gate
| National Route 7Pref. Route 40 (Sakata Matsuyama Route)
|style="text-align: center;"|144.9
|style="text-align: center;"|
|style="text-align: center;"|
|
|-
!style="background-color: #BFB;"|19-1
|Sakata-chuo IC
| National Route 47
|style="text-align: center;"|149.7
|style="text-align: center;"|
|style="text-align: center;"|
|
|-
!style="background-color: #BFB;"|20
|Sakata-Minato IC
|Pref. Route 59 (Sakata Yahata Route)
|style="text-align: center;"|156.4
|style="text-align: center;"|
|style="text-align: center;"|
|
|-
!style="background-color:#ffdead;"|
|style="background-color:#ffdead;"|Yuza-Hiko IC
|style="background-color:#ffdead;"| National Route 7
|style="text-align: center; background-color:#ffdead;"|
|style="text-align: center; background-color:#ffdead;"|
|style="text-align: center; background-color:#ffdead;"|
|style="background-color:#ffdead;"|Planned
|rowspan="3" style="text-align: center;"|Yuza
|-
!style="background-color:#ffdead;"|
|style="background-color:#ffdead;"|Yuza-Jurizuka IC
|style="background-color:#ffdead;"| National Route 7
|style="text-align: center; background-color:#ffdead;"|
|style="text-align: center; background-color:#ffdead;"|
|style="text-align: center; background-color:#ffdead;"|
|style="background-color:#ffdead;"|Planned
|-
!style="background-color: #ffdead;"|
|style="background-color:#ffdead;"|Yuza-Chokai IC
|style="background-color:#ffdead;"| National Route 345
|style="text-align: center; background-color:#ffdead;"|
|style="text-align: center; background-color:#ffdead;"|
|style="text-align: center; background-color:#ffdead;"|
|style="background-color:#ffdead;"|Planned
|-

Akita section
{| class="wikitable"
|-
!style="border-bottom:3px solid green;"|No.
!style="border-bottom:3px solid green;"|Name
!style="border-bottom:3px solid green;"|Connections
!style="border-bottom:3px solid green;"|Dist. fromOrigin
!style="border-bottom:3px solid green;"|Dist. fromTerminus
!style="border-bottom:3px solid green;"|Bus Stop
!style="border-bottom:3px solid green;"|Notes
!style="border-bottom:3px solid green;"|Location(all in Akita)
|-
!style="background-color: #BFB;"|11
|Kisakata IC
|Pref. Route 58 (Kisakata Yashima Route)
|style="text-align: center;|0.0
|style="text-align: center;|64.5
|style="text-align: center;|
|
|rowspan="4" style="text-align: center;"|Nikaho
|-
!style="background-color: #BFB;"|12
|Konoura IC
| National Route 7
|style="text-align: center;"|6.8
|style="text-align: center;"|57.7
|
|
|-
!style="background-color: #BFB;"|13
|Nikaho IC
| National Route 7
|style="text-align: center;"|13.7
|style="text-align: center;"|50.8
|
|
|-
!style="background-color: #BFB;"|
|style="background-color:#CCC;"|(Ryōzenji temporary IC)
|style="background-color:#CCC;"|
|style="text-align: center;background-color:#CCC;"|15.0
|style="text-align: center;background-color:#CCC;"|49.5
|style="background-color:#CCC;"|
|style="background-color:#CCC;"|Abolished on 27 October 2012
|-
!style="background-color: #BFB;"|PA
|Nishime PA
|
|style="text-align: center;"|20.0
|style="text-align: center;"|44.5
|style="text-align: center;"|
|
|rowspan="6" style="text-align: center;"|Yurihonjō
|-
!style="background-color: #BFB;"|14
|Honjō IC
| National Route 107
|style="text-align: center;"|26.2
|style="text-align: center;"|38.3
|style="text-align: center;"|
|
|-
!style="background-color: #BFB;"|14-1
|Ōuchi JCT
| National Route 105
|style="text-align: center;"|35.4
|style="text-align: center;"|29.1
|style="text-align: center;"|
|
|-
!style="background-color: #BFB;"|14-2
|Matsugasaki-Kameda IC
|
|style="text-align: center;"|40.3
|style="text-align: center;"|22.2
|style="text-align: center;"|
|
|-
!style="background-color: #BFB;"|TN
|Futago Tunnel
|
|style="text-align: center;"|↓
|style="text-align: center;"|↑
|style="text-align: center;"|
|
|-
!style="background-color: #BFB;"|15
|Iwaki IC
|Pref. Route 44 (Yūwa Iwaki Route)
|style="text-align: center;"|45.8
|style="text-align: center;"|16.7
|style="text-align: center;"|
|
|-
!style="background-color: #ffdead;"|
|style="background-color:#ffdead;"|Yūwa PA
|style="background-color:#ffdead;"|
|style="text-align: center; background-color:#ffdead;"|
|style="text-align: center; background-color:#ffdead;"|
|style="text-align: center; background-color:#ffdead;"|
|style="background-color:#ffdead;"|Open in 2020
|rowspan="4" style="text-align: center;"|Akita
|-
!style="background-color: #BFB;"|TB
|Akita Airport Toll Gate
|
|style="text-align: center;"|59.7
|style="text-align: center;"|2.8
|style="text-align: center;"|
|
|-
!style="background-color: #BFB;"|16
|Akita Airport IC
|Pref. Route 61 (Akita Goshono Yūwa Route)
|style="text-align: center;"|60.1
|style="text-align: center;"|2.4
|style="text-align: center;"|
|
|-
!style="background-color: #BFB;"|5-1
|Kawabe JCT
| Akita Expressway
|style="text-align: center;"|64.5
|style="text-align: center;"|0.0
|style="text-align: center;"|
|

References

External links 

 East Nippon Expressway Company

Expressways in Japan
Proposed roads in Japan
Roads in Akita Prefecture
Roads in Niigata Prefecture
Roads in Yamagata Prefecture